Hacırüstəmli (known as Frunze and Suvorovka until 1999) is a village and municipality in the Imishli Rayon of Azerbaijan. It has a population of 1,159.

References

Populated places in Imishli District